Leo Sweeney (born 1932) was a Canadian football player who played for the BC Lions and Calgary Stampeders. He played junior football in Vancouver.

Sweeney lived in Newry, Northern Ireland until his death in June, 2018. (Erin Sweeney, his niece).

References

1930s births
2018 deaths
BC Lions players
Calgary Stampeders players
Canadian football offensive linemen
Living people